David E. Cox (February 20, 1938 – July 13, 2010) was an American politician from Holdenville, Oklahoma. A Republican, he served as a California State Senator, representing the 1st district from December 2004 until his death in July 2010, and also served as a California State Assemblyman for the six years immediately before his Senate tenure, including three years as Assembly Republican Leader.

Career 
Cox was first elected to the Sacramento County Board of Supervisors in 1992 and served until 1998. Cox also served on the KVIE board as well as the Sacramento Municipal Utility District board. In 1994 Cox made an unsuccessful run for the then-6th Senate district in 1994 against veteran State Senator Leroy F. Greene. 

Cox was then elected to the California State Assembly, representing the 5th District from December 1998 to December 2004, and served as the Assembly Republican Leader from March 2000 through January 2004. 

In 2004, Cox successfully ran again for the state Senate, this time in the 1st district. His district included all or portions of Alpine, Amador, Calaveras, El Dorado, Lassen, Placer, Plumas, Modoc, Mono, Nevada, Sacramento and Sierra Counties. He served on the following Senate committees:

Local Government (Chair)
Appropriations (Vice Chair)
Banking, Finance and Insurance
Energy, Utilities and Communications
Health

Cox was named as the "Outstanding Senator for 2007" by the California State Sheriffs' Association.

Cox earned his bachelor's degree in business administration from the University of San Diego in 1961 and a master's degree from Golden Gate University in 1983. He was married with three children, and lived in Fair Oaks.

Cox was re-elected to his second and last Senate term in 2008 with over 60% of the vote.

Cox died in office on July 13, 2010, following a thirteen-year-long battle with prostate cancer.

References

External links
Official Website
Campaign Website
Project Vote Smart - Senator Dave Cox (CA) profile
Follow the Money - Dave Cox
2006 2004 2002 2000 1998 campaign contributions

1938 births
2010 deaths
People from Holdenville, Oklahoma
Politicians from Sacramento, California
Republican Party California state senators
Deaths from cancer in California
Deaths from prostate cancer
Republican Party members of the California State Assembly
University of San Diego alumni
Golden Gate University alumni
People from Fair Oaks, California
21st-century American politicians
20th-century American politicians